Ferrières-en-Brie (literally Ferrières in Brie) is a commune in the Seine-et-Marne department in the Île-de-France region in north-central France.

Geography
It is twinned with the village of Dunchurch, Warwickshire, United Kingdom.

Demographics
Inhabitants of Ferrières-en-Brie are called Ferrièrois.

Education
The town has a single public preschool and elementary school, groupe scolaire de la Taffarette.

Castle
 Château de Ferrières, built in the 19th century by Joseph Paxton for James de Rotschild on the place of the former castle of Joseph Fouché, Duke of Otranto

See also
Communes of the Seine-et-Marne department

References

External links

Home page 
1999 Land Use, from IAURIF (Institute for Urban Planning and Development of the Paris-Île-de-France région) 

 Château de la Ferrières english website

Communes of Seine-et-Marne
Val de Bussy